Club Deportivo Universidad de Concepción also known as Universidad de Concepción, are a Chilean football club based in Concepción, that is a current member of the Primera B. The club's home stadium is the Estadio Ester Roa de Concepción, that has a 30,480 spectators capacity.

History
A "Club Deportivo Universitario" amateur team played in the Regional Championship in the 1940s, 1950s and 1960s. They played with teams like Naval de Talcahuano, Lord Cochrane and Fernández Vial and became champions in 1962. The current Club Deportivo Universidad de Concepción was founded in 1994.

Tercera División: 1994–1997
Universidad de Concepción participates in football as a member of the Tercera División, organized by the Asociación Nacional de Fútbol Amateur (ANFA). The team played its first match against Deportes Talcahuano at Estadio El Morro on 10 April 1994. The club's coach was former Universitario footballer Luis Vera Avendaño. With 22 points that season, the club finished fourth in the South-central Zone in Tercera División and was nearly promoted to the Primera B (Premier B).

In the next season, Universidad de Concepción failed to duplicate the results of the last season, finishing seventh in the South Zone. However, the club won the relegation play-offs.

During the 1996 season, with former footballer Mario Osbén as the coach, the club was runner-up in the Tercera División, after finishing second behind Santiago Morning in the quadrangular play-offs. Universidad de Concepción had a record of sixteen victories and six defeats in 34 games.

In 1997, Universidad de Concepción won the Tercera División. The club was promoted to Premier B, the first professional tournament and the first title for the club following a 2–1 victory over Unión La Calera on 8 December 1997.

Professional era

In its first professional season, the club had success in Premier B 1998 and nearly qualified for the promotion play-offs to Primera División (Premier Division).

In 1999, the club finished ninth, prompting changes in club administration, including the hiring of a new coach, Luis Marcoleta. By 2002, the club was promoted to the Premier Division.

In 2003, under coach Fernando Díaz, the club unexpectedly qualified for the Copa Libertadores and the Copa Sudamericana in 2004.

In the Copa Libertadores, the club qualified in Group 3 with Cruzeiro, Santos Laguna and Caracas. However, the club finished last. In the Copa Sudamericana, the club qualified for the Chile/Bolivia preliminary after a victory over Santiago Wanderers. However, the team was eliminated after being defeated 4–2 by Bolívar in La Paz. The club's second goal in this game was scored by goalkeeper Nicolás Peric. The club was recognized as the best club in Chilean football by the IFFHS in 2004.

During the Torneo de Apertura 2006, Universidad de Concepción advanced to the semi-finals against Colo-Colo, but the team was defeated 4–3 in the first leg and 2–0 in the second leg. However, they earned the fifth position in the Annual Table of 2006. In the next season, under coach Marcelo Barticciotto, the team was runner-up in the Torneo de Clausura 2007, having been defeated again by Colo-Colo.

In the 2008 season, Barticciotto was dismissed and replaced by Jorge Pellicer. In the Torneo de Apertura, the club finished in 16th place with 21 points. In the second semester tournament, the Torneo de Clausura, the club again ended in 16th position, going to the promotion play-offs of Premier B (Second Division) against Coquimbo Unido. The club won this match in a 5–1 aggregate.

In the Copa Chile 2008–09, the club was proclaimed champion of the tournament after a 2–1 victory over Deportes Ovalle at Francisco Sánchez Rumoroso Stadium.

After a difficult showing at the Torneo de Apertura 2009, the club earned fifth place at the Torneo de Clausura. The club was eliminated once again by Colo-Colo.

In the 2010 Premier Division, Universidad de Concepción ended in 15th place with 38 points. The club went to the promotion play-offs and defeated Curicó Unido, a team which had been recently relegated to Premier B.

Honours
Copa Chile: 2
2008–09, 2014–15

Primera B (II): 1
2013

Tercera División (III): 1
1997

South American cups history

Stats

Seasons in Campeonato Nacional: 17 (2003–12, 2013/14-)
Seasons in Primera B (II): 6 (1998–02, 2013)
Seasons in Tercera División (III): 4 (1994–97)
Best Finish in Campeonato Nacional: Runner-up (2007 C, 2018)
Copa Libertadores Appearances: 2 (2004, 2018)
Copa Sudamericana Appearances: 3 (2004, 2015, 2016)
Largest Primera División Victory: 8–2 (v Palestino in 2003 A)
Largest Primera División Defeat: 0–5 (v Deportes Antofagasta in 2017 C)
Largest Copa Chile Victory: 5–2 (v Huachipato in 2011)

Players

Current squad

2021 Winter Transfers

In

Out

Managers

 Luis Vera (1994–95)
 Mario Osbén (1996–99)
 Luis Marcoleta (2000)
 Yuri Fernández (2001–02)
 Raúl Toro (2003)
 Fernando Díaz (2003)
 Óscar Meneses (2004–05)
 Edgardo Avilés (2005)
 Gualberto Jara (2005–06)
 Yuri Fernández (2006–07)
 Marcelo Barticciotto (2007–08)
 Yuri Fernández (interim) (2008)
 Jorge Pellicer (2008–10)
 Yuri Fernández (interim) (2010)
 Jaime Vera (2011)
 Mauricio Riffo (2011)
 Víctor Hugo Castañeda (2011)
 Yuri Fernández (2012)
 Fernando Díaz (2012)
 Pablo Sánchez (2013–14)
 Ronald Fuentes (2015–16)
 Francisco Bozán (2016–)

See also
 Universidad de Concepción
 Universidad de Concepción (basketball team)

External links

  
  Universidad de Concepción at the ANFP official website

 
Football clubs in Chile
Association football clubs established in 1994
Sport in Biobío Region
University and college association football clubs
1994 establishments in Chile
Concepción, Chile